May Our Chambers Be Full is a collaborative studio album by American singer-songwriter Emma Ruth Rundle and doom metal band Thou. It was released on October 30, 2020, through Sacred Bones Records as a part of the label's 'Alliance Series'. Recording sessions took place in August 2019 at Hightower Studios in New Orleans.

The Helm of Sorrow
The Helm of Sorrow is the companion extended play included on 'diehard' edition to May Our Chambers Be Full. It was recorded during the same 2019 sessions that yielded the album, and it includes the project's cover of The Cranberries' "Hollywood".

Critical reception

Metacritic, which assigns a normalized rating out of 100 to reviews from mainstream publications, the album received an average score of 85 based on six reviews. The aggregator AnyDecentMusic? has the critical consensus of the album at a 7.8 out of 10, based on eight reviews.

Luke Morton of Kerrang! gave the album excellent 5 out of 5, saying: "There’s plenty to latch onto, whether it's the neck-rending riffs, the snarling/soaring vocals or just wanting to vibe out and let the darkness envelope you; it's a display of artistry". Sam Shepherd of musicOMH claimed: "Both artists possess in spades the ability to make affecting, heavyweight emotional music. This emotional intensity and willingness to continuously explore the possibilities of sound (heavy or otherwise) is what May Our Chambers Be Full pivots around over the course of these seven incredible songs". AllMusic's James Christopher Monger stated: "for all of its epic grandiosity, May Our Chambers Be Full only clocks in at a mere 37 minutes, but in doing so leaves a more indelible impression". Guy Oddy of The Arts Desk wrote: "Dramatic but melodic tunes that are relatively mellow and laidback one minute and then screaming and visceral the next". Dafydd Jenkins of Loud and Quiet said: "The whole LP would be a great release for either artist, but it's the brilliant convergence of sensibilities that sets it apart in the landscape of alternative metal". Todd Dedman of Beats Per Minute said: "it's the document of two beloved alt-metal worlds colliding to head-shuddering effect; a record of skull crushing intensity in places, with merciless riffs conjured up from the deepest abyss, which are counterpoised with quiet, ethereal dark-folk introspection – a mix that shouldn't really work but absolutely does". Grayson Haver Currin of Pitchfork said: "However exhilarating its discrete peaks, May Our Chambers Be Full is one of those common collaborations that's more notable for what it says about those who made it than for the new material itself".

Accolades

Track listing

Personnel
Louis Michot – fiddle (track 7)
James Whitten – mixing, recording
Adam Tucker – mastering
Craig Mulcahy – layout, photography
David Correll – layout

References

External links

2020 albums
Collaborative albums
Emma Ruth Rundle albums
Sacred Bones Records albums
Thou (American band) albums
Doom metal albums by American artists